Tascina is a genus of moths within the Castniidae family.  It is found in South East Asia.

Selected species
Tascina dalattensis Fukuda, 2000
Tascina orientalis Westwood, 1877
Tascina metallica Pagenstecher, 1890
Tascina nicevillei (Hampson, 1895)

External links
Moths of Borneo

Castniidae